This is an article showing the matches of Fenerbahçe in European competitions.

Best achievements

UEFA competitions

Statistics 

Source: UEFA.comPld = Matches played; W = Matches won; D = Matches drawn; L = Matches lost; GF = Goals for; GA = Goals against; GD = Goal Difference.

European Cup / UEFA Champions League

UEFA Cup Winners' Cup

UEFA Cup / UEFA Europa League

UEFA Europa Conference League

By country

UEFA club ranking

Current ranking

Ranking history

Non-UEFA competition

Statistics 

Pld = Matches played; W = Matches won; D = Matches drawn; L = Matches lost; GF = Goals for; GA = Goals against; GD = Goal Difference.

Balkans Cup

By country

References

External links

  
  

European
Turkish football clubs in international competitions